The 1966–67 Montreal Canadiens season was the Canadiens' 58th season of play, and 50th in the National Hockey League (NHL). The Canadiens lost in the Stanley Cup final to the Toronto Maple Leafs in six games.  This was the final season before the 1967 NHL Expansion.

Regular season

Final standings

Record vs. opponents

Schedule and results

Playoffs
In the playoffs, the Canadiens met the New York Rangers in the first round, sweeping the series 4–0 to advance to the Finals.

Finals

In the finals, the Canadiens played the Toronto Maple Leafs, whose "Over the Hill Gang" produced an upset win over the defending champion Canadiens, winning the series 4–2.

Player statistics

Regular season
Scoring

Goaltending

Playoffs
Scoring

Goaltending

Awards and records

Transactions

Draft picks
Montreal's draft picks at the 1966 NHL Amateur Draft held at the Mount Royal Hotel in Montreal, Quebec.

See also
 1966–67 NHL season

References
Canadiens on Hockey Database
Canadiens on NHL Reference

Montreal Canadiens seasons
Mon
Mon
Mon